Jeon So-min (born April 7, 1986) is a South Korean actress, model and author. Jeon made her debut in 2004 with sitcom Miracle. In 2006, she made her big-screen debut through the film, Cinderella. Jeon played her first leading role in the television series Princess Aurora, she received recognition for her role at the 2013 MBC Drama Awards, where she won the "Best New Actress Award". 

Her other notable performances include the daily drama Tomorrow Victory (2015), romantic comedy drama Something About 1 Percent (2016), medical thriller Cross (2018), romantic comedy drama Top Star U-back (2018), Review: Notebook of my Embarrassing Days (2018), Birthday Letter (2019) and Big Data Romance (2019).

Jeon later joined variety show Running Man as a regular cast member beginning in April 2017, where she achieved international recognition. She also appeared in the first two seasons of variety show Sixth Sense.

Early life
Jeon So-min was born on April 7, 1986. Her hometown is at Goyang, Gyeonggi Province. Jeon has a younger brother. Before Jeon's official debut in the acting industry, she had been working as a fashion magazine model on her second year of high school. She graduated from Dongduk Women's University, majoring in Broadcasting and Entertainment.

Career
In April 2017, Jeon joined Running Man as a regular cast member.

In January 2020, Jeon published her first book titled You Can Call Me After a Drink.

In April 2020, it was announced that Jeon has signed with King Kong by Starship.

In October 2020, Jeon starred in The Name.

In May 2022, Jeon renewed her contract with King Kong by Starship.

Filmography

Film

Television series

Web series

Television shows

Hosting

Music video appearances

Discography

Singles

Narrations

Composition credits

Ambassador roles

Awards and nominations

References

External links

 Official website 
 
 

1986 births
King Kong by Starship artists
Living people
South Korean television actresses
South Korean film actresses
People from Goyang
Dongduk Women's University alumni